Giuseppe Ingrassia (born September 9, 1988 in Palermo) is an Italian professional football player currently playing for A.S.D. Licata 1931.

External links
 

1988 births
Living people
Italian footballers
Italian expatriate sportspeople in Belgium
Hellas Verona F.C. players
U.S. Pergolettese 1932 players
C.S. Visé players
Association football goalkeepers